The men's tournament in ice hockey at the 2007 Canada Winter Games was held in Whitehorse, Yukon between February 24 and March 2, 2007. Twelve provinces and territories competed in the tournament, with all but Nunavut participating.

Preliminary round
All times are local (UTC−8).

Key

Group A

Group B

Group C

Group D

Relegation round

9–12th place placement

5–8th place placement

Playoff round

Bracket

Quarterfinals

Semifinals

Bronze medal game

Gold medal game

Final ranking and statistics

Final ranking

External links
Hockey Canada tournament website

2007 Canada Winter Games